Marvel Television was an American television production company responsible for live-action and animated (through Marvel Animation) television shows and direct-to-DVD series based on characters from Marvel Comics. The division was  based at affiliate ABC Studios' location.  Marvel Television also collaborated with 20th Century Fox in producing shows based on the X-Men franchise such as Legion and The Gifted. The division was transferred to Marvel Studios from Marvel Entertainment in October 2019, and was folded into the former two months later. Marvel Television is currently used as a label.

Background
Marvel previously licensed a few characters out for TV shows, with animated shows being more successful than the live action shows. The Incredible Hulk (1978–1982), produced by Universal Television and aired on CBS, was Marvel's only successful live action television series, running five seasons. The last TV series, Blade: The Series, produced by New Line Television (now ceased and folded into Warner Bros. Television), was canceled after one season on Spike.

Marvel's first live action TV licenses were for Spider-Man with the character in The Electric Company's Spidey Super Stories segments (1974–1977), CBS's The Amazing Spider-Man series (1977–1979) and Toei's tokusatsu style Spider-Man series (1978–1979). The Amazing Spider-Man pulled in reasonable ratings but was canceled in 1979 by CBS as they did not want to be known as the "comic book" network as they had already had three comic book-based shows, choosing to stay with The Incredible Hulk, as it had the better ratings.

In 1978, Doctor Strange received a television film to act as a pilot similarly to Spider-Man and Hulk. Captain America also starred in two pilots in 1979, Captain America and Captain America II: Death Too Soon. None of these pilots were picked up.

After the end of The Incredible Hulk in 1982, live action Marvel shows did not return until 1988 with The Incredible Hulk Returns, designed as a backdoor pilot for Thor. Additionally, The Trial of the Incredible Hulk acted as a backdoor pilot for Daredevil, and The Death of the Incredible Hulk premiered in 1990.

Three direct pilots were done in the 1990s, Power Pack, Generation X and Nick Fury: Agent of S.H.I.E.L.D., but none of them were picked up for series. Marvel had better luck in syndicating their properties in the late 1990s and early 2000s with Night Man and Mutant X, lasting two and three seasons, respectively. The latter show triggered a lawsuit by 20th Century Fox, who held the film rights for the X-Men. As a follow up to the Blade film series, Blade: The Series was created for cable TV, lasting one season in 2006.

History

Entertainment division
On June 28, 2010, Marvel Entertainment announced the start of Marvel Television, together with the appointment of Jeph Loeb to head up the division as executive vice president, head of television. In October 2010, it was announced that the first live-action television series from Marvel Television for ABC would be centered on the Hulk, developed by Guillermo del Toro. In December 2010, it was revealed that Melissa Rosenberg was developing AKA Jessica Jones, based on the comic book series Alias and centered on Jessica Jones, for ABC, intended to air in 2011 of the 2011–2012 television season.

At San Diego Comic-Con International 2011, Loeb revealed, in addition to the Hulk project and AKA Jessica Jones, Marvel Television also had Cloak and Dagger and Mockingbird in development at ABC Family. In October 2011, ABC Studios sold a Punisher script to Fox, who gave the project a put-pilot commitment. In April 2012, Marvel Television signed with Creative Artists Agency for live action representation. In May 2012, it was announced that the Hulk project was not ready for the 2012–2013 season, and would possibly be for the 2013–2014 season. It was also announced that ABC had passed on AKA Jessica Jones.

In July 2012, it was reported that Marvel had again entered into discussions with ABC to create a show set in the Marvel Cinematic Universe, and in August 2012, ABC ordered a pilot to be written by Joss Whedon, Jed Whedon, and Maurissa Tancharoen and directed by Joss Whedon, which became Agents of S.H.I.E.L.D. It was officially ordered to series on May 10, 2013. By September 2013, Marvel was developing a series inspired by the Agent Carter Marvel One-Shot, featuring Peggy Carter, with Deadline reporting it was one of several series in development at Marvel.

By October 2013, Marvel was preparing four drama series and a miniseries, totaling 60 episodes, to present to video on demand services and cable providers, with Netflix, Amazon, and WGN America expressing interest. In November 2013, it was announced that Disney would provide Netflix with live-action series starting in 2015, based on Daredevil, Jessica Jones, Iron Fist, and Luke Cage, leading up to a miniseries based on the Defenders. Responding to the Netflix announcement, Disney CEO Bob Iger said that Daredevil, Luke Cage, Iron Fist and Jessica Jones may appear on film if their shows are successful and that another outlet was chosen as ABC and Disney XD could not handle all Marvel shows. Disney will spend approximately $200 million in financing for the series. The four Netflix shows are set in the Marvel Cinematic Universe.

It was also revealed in November 2013 that the Hulk project first announced in 2012 had been shelved, with Loeb saying, when "we saw what Joss Whedon and Mark Ruffalo were creating in The Avengers, that was a better solution". Additionally, Del Toro wanted to create a more violent take on the character than what ABC was hoping to achieve with the series. On May 8, 2014, ABC officially renewed Agents of S.H.I.E.L.D. for a second season and ordered Marvel's Agent Carter straight to series, which later aired in January 2015.

In early April 2015, two unspecified shows were said to be in development to air on ABC: one was a spin-off series of Agents of S.H.I.E.L.D. centered on Bobbi Morse (Adrianne Palicki) and Lance Hunter (Nick Blood), which was being developed by Bell and writer Paul Zbyszewski based on storylines occurring at the end of the second season, and would receive its own pilot rather than a backdoor pilot; and another with writer-producer John Ridley. On May 7, 2015, ABC renewed Agents of S.H.I.E.L.D. and Agent Carter for a third and second season, respectively. Additionally, ABC also passed on the Agents of S.H.I.E.L.D. spinoff, though ABC Entertainment president Paul Lee did not rule out returning to the spin-off in the future, and Lee also confirmed that Ridley was working on a Marvel property for ABC. Also in May, Iger indicated that Disney saw potential in creating a streaming service dedicated to Marvel content as a way to further "take product... directly to consumer".

In August 2015, the Agents of S.H.I.E.L.D. spin-off series received new life as a reworked series, titled Marvel's Most Wanted, with a pilot order. Bell and Zbyszewski once again developed the series, while also serving as co-writers of the pilot, executive producers, and showrunners, with Loeb also attached as executive producer. The series would still focus on Morse and Hunter, with Palicki and Blood both attached, but is no longer intended to be a true spin-off of Agents of S.H.I.E.L.D. as previously believed, instead "being described as a new take focusing on the same duo and their continuing adventures."

At the end of August 2015, Marvel Entertainment's film subsidiary Marvel Studios was integrated into The Walt Disney Studios, leaving Marvel Television and Marvel Animation (formerly part of Marvel Studios) under Marvel Entertainment and CEO Isaac Perlmutter's control.

In October 2015, ABC ordered a put pilot for a half-hour live action comedy series Damage Control, based on the comics construction company of the same name. The series is being developed by Ben Karlin. Later in the month, FX ordered a pilot for Legion, about David Haller, a young man who may be more than human. The pilot was produced by FX Productions (FXP) and Marvel Television, with FXP handling the physical production. Also in October, Fox Broadcasting Company announced that 20th Century Fox Television and Marvel Television were developing a series titled Hellfire Club, based on the secret society from the comics of the same name.

In January 2016, Lee stated the Most Wanted pilot would begin production "in the next few months" and announced that a second Marvel comedy series was in development in addition to Damage Control. Also in January, Netflix was in the early stages of developing a Punisher television series starring Jon Bernthal, who appeared in the second season of Daredevil. More information was revealed regarding the Legion series, including that in addition to the pilot, FX had ordered several scripts and that it would not take place in the established X-Men film universe but in a parallel universe instead. Should the series be picked up, it would consist of 10 episodes and is expected to air in 2016.

In April 2016, the ABC-owned network Freeform greenlit Cloak & Dagger with a straight-to-series order as Marvel's first work with ABC Signature. The series, which is set in the MCU, premiered in 2018. At the end of the month, Marvel and Netflix officially picked up the series, The Punisher, with Bernthal attached to reprise his role as the lead character. In May 2016, ABC cancelled Agent Carter and passed on the pilot for Most Wanted.

In July 2016, Fox and Marvel announced a put pilot order for an untitled series developed by Matt Nix. The series, which will be produced by 20th Century Fox and Marvel, with 20th Century Fox handling physical production, focuses on two ordinary parents who discover their children possess mutant powers, forcing them to run from the government and join an underground network of mutants. Nix will serve as an executive producer along with Bryan Singer, Lauren Shuler Donner, Simon Kinberg, Loeb and Jim Chory. It was also revealed that Hellfire Club was no longer in development.

The following month, it was announced that Runaways had received a pilot order, along with additional scripts, from the streaming service Hulu, based on the team of the same name. The pilot is written by Josh Schwartz and Stephanie Savage, who also serve as executive producers and showrunners. By the end of the month, the division and ABC Studios were developing a half-hour comedy series based on the New Warriors featuring Squirrel Girl, with the series being offered to cable networks and streaming outlets. In April 2017, Freeform announced a straight-to-series order for the half-hour live action series, Marvel's New Warriors, with the first season, consisting of 10 episodes, set to air in 2018. In May 2017, Hulu ordered Runaways to series with 10 episodes, to premiere on November 21, 2017.

In November 2016, Marvel Television and IMAX Corporation announced Inhumans, to be produced in conjunction with ABC Studios, and to air on ABC. The series, which is co-financed by IMAX and saw the first two episodes and select subsequent action sequences filmed with IMAX digital cameras, had versions of the first two episodes be screened in IMAX beginning September 1, 2017, for two weeks, before premiering on ABC on September 29.

In May 2017, Fox ordered the Matt Nix TV series, now titled The Gifted, to series, and FXX placed a series order for an adult animated series based on Deadpool, which will be co-produced by Marvel Television, FX Productions and ABC Signature Studios. Donald Glover and his brother Stephen Glover would serve as showrunners, executive producers and writers for the series. In August 2017, senior vice president of original programming Karim Zreik indicated that Marvel Television was working with ABC on a "Jessica Jones-esque" female-focused show. By November 2017, Disney was developing a Marvel series specifically for release on its new Disney+ streaming service, which it planned to launch before the end of 2019. By March 2018, the Deadpool series was no longer in development. In May 2018, ABC cancelled Inhumans after one season. By September, Allan Heinberg began developing a Marvel series for ABC about female superheroes.

In October 2018, Netflix cancelled both Iron Fist and Luke Cage, each after two seasons, followed by the cancellation of Daredevil in November after three seasons. Luke Cage was cancelled due to third season financial terms, while Daredevil was due to Netflix looking to fund their own properties. Kevin Mayer, chairman of Walt Disney Direct-to-Consumer and International, indicated that he would consider the show for Disney+, but the Netflix-Marvel TV pact restricts the appearance of the four original characters from any non-Netflix series for two years after being canceled. Thus 2020 would be the earliest that the shows could be revived on Disney+.

In February 2019, it was announced that Legion would end after its third season. It was also revealed that Heinberg's series would not move forward at ABC. In addition, Hulu ordered four adult animated Marvel series leading up to a crossover special titled The Offenders, all to be executive produced by Loeb. Hulu also expressed interest in reviving the cancelled Netflix series. Netflix then cancelled both Jessica Jones and The Punisher. In August 2019, Loeb revealed Marvel Television was working on series for the streaming service Disney+.

Studios label
In October 2019, Marvel Studios President Kevin Feige was given the title of Chief Creative Officer, Marvel, and would oversee Marvel Television and Marvel Family Entertainment (animation), with both being placed under the Marvel Studios banner. With the promotion of Feige, Loeb was expected to leave his post as the head of Marvel Television by Thanksgiving. Later in December 10, Marvel Television was folded into Marvel Studios, which inherited all of Marvel Television's shows that were in development at the time, and no new series were being considered from Marvel Television. In January 2022, Hulu's head of content Craig Erwich stated that additional seasons of M.O.D.O.K. and Hit Monkey, the two remaining series from Marvel Television, would be determined solely by the Marvel Studios team.

Production library

Series
All series are part of the Marvel Cinematic Universe, unless otherwise noted.

Pilots

See also
Marvel Productions
List of Marvel Cinematic Universe television series
X-Men in television
List of television series based on Marvel Comics
List of unproduced television projects based on Marvel Comics

Notes

References

External links
 

 
2010 establishments in California
2019 disestablishments in California
American companies established in 2010
American companies disestablished in 2019
Defunct film and television production companies of the United States
Disney production studios
Former subsidiaries of The Walt Disney Company
Marvel Entertainment
Mass media companies established in 2010
Mass media companies disestablished in 2019
Television production companies of the United States
Companies based in Burbank, California